is a 1952 Japanese drama film written and directed by Kaneto Shindo.

Cast
 Susumu Fujita as Kōsuke Kijima
 Nobuko Otowa as Atsuko Fujikawa
 Mitsuko Mito as Tokie Kijima
 Ichirō Sugai as Manager
 Taiji Tonoyama as Miyabayashi
 Saburō Date as Tomita

References

External links
 

1952 films
1952 drama films
Japanese drama films
1950s Japanese-language films
Films directed by Kaneto Shindo
Films scored by Akira Ifukube
Japanese black-and-white films
1950s Japanese films